The Toyota W Engine is a water cooled straight-4 diesel engine.

1W

The Toyota 1W Engine was built by Hino Motors for use in Toyota Dyna and Toyoace light trucks in the Japanese market. It is a  direct injection 8 valve OHV diesel engine. The equivalent Hino W04D engine is used for Toyota Dyna trucks  and in current model Hino 300 Series trucks 

This engine was also used and marinized by the American motorboat manufacturer Bayliner for use in their 32 Motoryacht from 1985-1995.

Applications
 Toyota Dyna (WU26, WU40, WU50, WU90, WU95)
 Toyota ToyoAce
 Toyota Type 73 Medium Truck (first generation)

See also
 List of Toyota engines

References

W
Diesel engines by model
Straight-four engines